Maria Torres-Springer (born January 24, 1977) is an American government official and former nonprofit executive who is the Deputy Mayor for Economic and Workforce Development for New York City. Previously the vice president for U.S. programs at the Ford Foundation, Torres-Springer was commissioner of the New York City Department of Small Business Services and its Department of Housing Preservation and Development. She was also the president and CEO of the New York City Economic Development Corporation.

Early life and education 
Torres-Springer's parents emigrated to the United States from the Philippines. They struggled financially and worked many jobs. Her family used Section 8 vouchers and food stamps throughout her childhood.

Torres-Springer completed a bachelor's degree in ethics, politics, and economics at Yale University. She earned a master's in public policy from the Harvard Kennedy School.

Career 
Torres-Springer was a senior policy advisor in the office of the deputy mayor of New York City for economic development and rebuilding. She was the chief operating officer of Friends of the High Line. She worked as the executive vice president and chief of staff of the New York City Economic Development Corporation (NYCEDC).

While Bill de Blasio was the Mayor of New York City, Torres-Springer served as the commissioner of the New York City Department of Small Business Services before becoming the president and CEO of the NYCEDC in June 2015. De Blasio later appointed Torres-Springer to lead the New York City Department of Housing Preservation and Development. In those roles, she redeveloped the Spofford Juvenile Center into an arts center with affordable housing. Torres-Springer also oversaw the Far Rockaway, Queens neighborhood plan. In February 2019, she stepped down from the department of housing preservation in what real-estate magazine The Real Deal called part of "the latest in a wave of top officials leaving the de Blasio administration."

Torres-Springer served as vice president for U.S. programs at the Ford Foundation from 2019 to 2021. In December 2021, New York City mayor-elect Eric Adams named her the incoming deputy mayor for economic and workforce development. Torres-Springer and Meera Joshi are the first Asian Americans to serve in these roles. They assumed those positions effective January 1, 2022.

Personal life 
Torres-Springer resided in Brooklyn. She is married to Jamie Torres-Springer and has two daughters.

See also 
 Filipinos in the New York metropolitan area

References 

1977 births
21st-century American businesswomen
21st-century American businesspeople
21st-century American women politicians
American women of Filipino descent in politics
Asian-American people in New York (state) politics
Deputy mayors of New York City
Harvard Kennedy School alumni
Living people
Place of birth missing (living people)
Politicians from Brooklyn
Women in New York (state) politics
Yale University alumni
21st-century American politicians